Coleophora beticella is a moth of the family Coleophoridae that is found in Spain.

References

beticella
Moths described in 1987
Moths of Europe